The Sri Lanka Administrative Service (SLAS) (Sinhala: ශ්‍රී ලංකා පරිපාලන සේවය; śrī laṁkā paripālana sēvaya) is the key administrative service of the Government of Sri Lanka, with civil servants working for both in the Central Government as well as in the provincial councils. It was formed as the Ceylon Administrative Service (CAS) in 1963 as the successor to the Ceylon Civil Service which was abolished on May 1, 1963. It is the senior of the public services.

Based on the British Civil Service the SLAS is the permanent bureaucracy that helps the elected officials on day-to-day functions of government. They are selected, promoted by the Public Service Commission. But top positions in the government such as Permanent Secretaries are appointed by the President, in theory on the recommendations of the Public Service Commission.

A Permanent Secretary is the top bureaucrat of the government ministry and is responsible for the day-to-day functions of the ministry whereas in theory the minister is responsible only for drafting policy. The head of the SLAS is the Secretary to the President.

A Chief Secretary is a Special Grade officer of the Sri Lanka Administrative Service in the provinces which is equivalent to a Permanent Secretary of the central government known as Chief Secretary. There are nine Chief Secretaries, one for each of the nine provinces.

Grading schemes
Until 2005, broader term officers are classed into SLAS class 1 officers, SLAS class 2 grade 1, and SLAS class 2 grade 2. All grades from SLAS class 1 and above (see table) are part of the "Senior officers ". The Secretary to the Treasury was the traditional head of the Civil Service during the time of the old Ceylon Civil Service, but in years after the establishment of the SLAS the President's Secretary is the de facto head of the SLAS if he/she is a former SLAS officer.

After 1 January 2005 Sri Lanka Administrative service introduced four grades, such as:
 Special Grade offices (present cadre is 200)
 Class I officers (present cadre is 507)
 Class II officers (present cadre is 639)
 Class III officers (present cadre is 1059)

Below the "Senior officers "(Special Grade offices, Class I officers and ), each individual department can put in place its own grading.

The traditional titles for each grade of the civil service are as follows:

 The post of Deputy Secretary is only used in the Ministry of Finance is ranked just below the post of Permanent Secretary.

Notable members of the SLAS
Nissanka Wijeyeratne
Dharmasena Wijesinghe
Ronnie De Mel
Bradman Weerakoon
Sarath Amunugama
Wimal Amarasekara
Sanath Weerakoon
Prematilaka Mapitigama
Lalith Weeratunga
P.B. Abeykoon
R. Paskaralingam
Mahinda Deshapriya
Tilak Ranaviraja

See also
Public Services of Sri Lanka

References

External links
Ministry of Public Administration and Home Affairs

Civil Service of Sri Lanka
Government of Sri Lanka

Public administration
Administrative Service